Pij Bon (also Romanized as Pīj Bon; also known as Pīch Bon and Pīchbon) is a village in Alamut-e Pain Rural District, Rudbar-e Alamut District, Qazvin County, Qazvin Province, Iran. At the 2006 census, its population was 76, in 22 families.

References 

Populated places in Qazvin County